Millennium Wind (foaled April 30, 1998 ) is an American Thoroughbred racehorse and the winner of the 2001 Blue Grass Stakes.

Career

Millennium Wind's first race was on November 18, 2000, at Hollywood Park, where he came in first. His next race was at the 2000 Los Alamitos Futurity. where he came in 2nd place.

He picked up his first graded stakes win on January 21, 2001, by winning the Santa Catalina Stakes. He then came in second on March 11, 2001 at the Louisiana Derby.

He then won the biggest race of his career, which turned out to be the last win of his career, by winning the 2001 Blue Grass Stakes.

He competed in the 2001 Kentucky Derby, coming in 11th, where he was injured. His last race was on November 2, 2001, where he came in 7th place. He was officially retired in May 2002.

Death
Millennium Wind was euthanized on July 28, 2012.

Pedigree

References

1998 racehorse births